Florida Ridge is a census-designated place (CDP) in Indian River County, Florida, United States. The population was 18,164 at the 2010 census.

Florida Ridge is part of the Sebastian–Vero Beach Metropolitan Statistical Area.

Geography
Florida Ridge is located at  (27.574529, -80.391685).

Demographics

As of the census of 2000, there were 15,217 people, 6,412 households, and 4,437 families residing in the CDP. The racial makeup of the CDP was 85.54% White, 11.10% African American, 0.19% Native American, 0.68% Asian, 0.01% Pacific Islander, 0.99% from other races, and 1.49% from two or more races. Hispanic or Latino of any race were 4.07% of the population.

There were 6,412 households, out of which 26.6% had children under the age of 18 living with them, 54.6% were married couples living together, 10.6% had a female householder with no husband present, and 30.8% were non-families. 25.4% of all households were made up of individuals, and 15.3% had someone living alone who was 65 years of age or older.  The average household size was 2.37 and the average family size was 2.81.

In the CDP, the population was spread out, with 22.6% under the age of 18, 6.0% from 18 to 24, 25.3% from 25 to 44, 20.0% from 45 to 64, and 26.1% who were 65 years of age or older.  The median age was 42 years. For every 100 females, there were 91.9 males.  For every 100 females age 18 and over, there were 88.6 males.

The median income for a household in the CDP was $37,608, and the median income for a family was $43,395. Males had a median income of $29,104 versus $21,753 for females. The per capita income for the CDP was $19,671.  About 6.4% of families and 9.5% of the population were below the poverty line, including 14.0% of those under age 18 and 4.5% of those age 65 or over.

References

Census-designated places in Indian River County, Florida
Census-designated places in Florida
Populated places on the Intracoastal Waterway in Florida